Bernard F. "Chris" Christiaens (born March 7, 1940) is an American politician in the state of Montana. He served in the Montana State Senate from 1983 to 1986 and 1991 to 2002.

References

1940 births
Living people
People from Conrad, Montana
Politicians from Great Falls, Montana
University of Providence alumni
Businesspeople from Montana
Democratic Party Montana state senators